Mount Davis is a prominent peak in the Ansel Adams Wilderness on the Inyo National Forest and south of Yosemite National Park. The peak was named in honor of Lieutenant Milton Fennimore Davis, who was with the first troops detailed to guard Yosemite National Park. Davis was the first person to climb the peak.

References 

Mountains of the Ansel Adams Wilderness
Inyo National Forest
Mountains of Madera County, California
Mountains of Mono County, California
Mountains of Northern California